Elachista pigerella is a moth of the family Elachistidae. It is found from Germany to the Iberian Peninsula, Sardinia and Italy. It is also found in Russia and on Cyprus.

Adults are brownish and unicolorous.

The larvae feed on Carex flacca. They mine the leaves of their host plant. The mine has the form of a narrow corridor, completely filled with frass. It descends from just below the tip down to the leaf base. From there, it continues in the leaf. Full-grown larvae have been found in the hollowed out base of the stem. Larvae can be found from April to June.

References

pigerella
Moths described in 1854
Moths of Europe